Dipogon may refer to:

 Dipogon (wasp), a genus of spider wasps
 Dipogon (plant), a genus of plants of the family Fabaceae